This list of botanical gardens and arboretums in Connecticut is intended to include all significant botanical gardens and arboretums in the U.S. state of Connecticut

See also
List of botanical gardens and arboretums in the United States

References 

 
Arboreta in Connecticut
botanical gardens and arboretums in Connecticut